Dallow is a surname. Notable people with the surname include:

Graeme Dallow (1930–2014), New Zealand police officer
Paul Dallow, New Zealand hurdler
Ross Dallow (1937–2020), New Zealand police officer
Simon Dallow (born 1964), New Zealand journalist, barrister and television personality

See also 

 Dalloz (surname)